Shake Hands with Murder is a 1944 American comedy mystery film directed by Albert Herman and starring Iris Adrian, Frank Jenks and Douglas Fowley. The film is a B movie released by the low-budget distributor Producers Releasing Corporation.

Synopsis
Patsy Brent runs a small bail bond company. Her ambitious but dull-witted partner Eddie Jones secures bail for Steve Morgan,  a man accused of embezzling $100,000 from his bank. Brent is furious and is forced to track Morgan before he can skip the country. When the president of the bank is found murdered, she also suspects that Morgan may even be a killer as well. However he is trying to prove his innocence of the charge, and Brent is persuaded to assist him in finding the real culprit.

Cast
 Iris Adrian as Patsy Brent  
 Frank Jenks as Eddie Jones  
 Douglas Fowley as Steve Morgan 
 Jack Raymond as Joe Blake  
 Claire Rochelle as Miss Johnson, Secretary  
 Herbert Rawlinson as John Clark 
 Juan de la Cruz as Mr. Stanton  
 I. Stanford Jolley as Mr. Haskins 
 Forrest Taylor as Mr. Kennedy  
 George Kirby as George Adams  
 Gene Roth as William Howard  
 Anitra Sparrow as Waitress  
 Buck Harrington as Police Sergeant

References

Bibliography 
 Dixon, Wheeler. Producers Releasing Corporation: A Comprehensive Filmography and History. McFarland, 1986.

External links 
 

1944 films
1944 mystery films
1944 comedy films
1940s comedy mystery films
American comedy mystery films
Films directed by Albert Herman
Producers Releasing Corporation films
American black-and-white films
1940s English-language films
1940s American films